Four Japanese destroyers have borne the name .

  was a  destroyer of the Imperial Japanese Navy, launched in 1902 and decommissioned in 1923.
  was a  destroyer of the Imperial Japanese Navy, launched in 1935 and sunk 1943 in the Battle of Blackett Strait.

See also
 Murasame
 Murasame-class destroyer

Citations

References
 
 


Imperial Japanese Navy ship names
Japan Maritime Self-Defense Force ship names
Japanese Navy ship names